Marco Odermatt (born 8 October 1997) is a Swiss World Cup alpine ski racer who races in giant slalom and the speed disciplines. Odermatt competed for Switzerland at two Junior World Championships and three World Championships.

Career
At the 2016 Junior World Championships in Sochi, Odermatt won the bronze medal in super-G and the gold medal in giant slalom, which allowed him to make his World Cup debut in March 2016 in the giant slalom at the season finals in St. Moritz. At the 2018 Junior World Championships in Davos, Odermatt won an unprecedented five gold medals (combined, downhill, super-G, giant slalom, and team event).

In the next season, Odermatt achieved his first victory in giant slalom in Santa Caterina and finished second in the giant slalom and overall World Cup titles, both times after Alexis Pinturault.

Odermatt dominated the 2021–22 season, winning seven races as well as the overall and giant slalom titles. He achieved his childhood dream of winning the historic giant slalom at the Chuenisbärgli in Adelboden. He represented Switzerland at the 2022 Winter Olympics, where he won the gold medal in the giant slalom, recording the fastest time in the first run and finishing 0.19 seconds ahead of runner-up Žan Kranjec.

World Cup results

Season titles

Season standings

Race victories

World Championship results

Olympic Results

Junior World Championship results

References

External links

Marco Odermatt at Swiss Ski Team 
Marco Odermatt at Stöckli Skis

1997 births
Swiss male alpine skiers
Living people
Alpine skiers at the 2022 Winter Olympics
Olympic alpine skiers of Switzerland
Medalists at the 2022 Winter Olympics
Olympic gold medalists for Switzerland
Olympic medalists in alpine skiing
21st-century Swiss people